Welcome to Scokland is the collaborative effort of hip hop artists Keak Da Sneak of Oakland, California and San Quinn of San Francisco, California, released in December 2008 by Ehustl Entertainment. It debuted on the R&B/Hip-Hop Albums chart at #64, on the Rap Albums chart at #11, and at #30 on the Heatseekers Albums chart.

Track listing
"Lil' Quinn Intro"
"Welcome to Scokland"
"Blue Dolphin"
"Hot 'N Cool"
"She Fine"
"Hollarin'"
"Copy Cat"
"Marina Ted Game Profane Slang"
"Wanna See"
"Back To Life"
"C.A.S.H."
"Streets Don't Lie"
"We Can Bubble Up"
"Comfortably Numb"
"Fool 4 U"
"Too Much"
"On One"
"Da Hood In Me"
"Cannons On The Blocks

References

External links
 Ehustl Entertainment on Myspace
 Keak Da Sneak on Myspace
 San Quinn on Myspace

2008 albums
Keak da Sneak albums
San Quinn albums